Michael Craft Johnson (born 1950), who goes by the pen name Michael Craft, is an American author of gay and lesbian mystery novels. His 2019 novel ChoirMaster won the IBPA Benjamin Franklin Award for LGBTQ, and four of his novels have been finalists for the Lambda Literary Award for Gay Mystery.

Personal life 
In 1950, Craft was born in Elgin, Illinois, where he remained until he ventured to the University of Illinois at Urbana-Champaign. In the 1980s, he moved to Kenosha, Wisconsin.

Craft met his now husband, Leon, in 1982.

In 2005, Craft and Leon moved near Palm Springs, California. 

When California legalized same-sex marriage in 2013, Craft and Leon were wed. The couple now lives in Rancho Mirage, California.

Education 
As a child, Craft attended Catholic grade school for eight years, then became a student at Elgin Academy, then a private boarding school, where he graduated as class valedictorian.

Craft studied graphic design at the University of Illinois at Urbana-Champaign. He pursued a graduate degree at the Institute for Communications Research but dropped out in 1976.

Craft later received a Master of Fine Arts in Creative writing from Antioch University, Los Angeles.

Career 
Craft began his career at the Chicago Tribune as an art director, a position he held for 10 years. While at the Tribune, he moved to Kenosha, Wisconsin and traveled to Chicago by train, during which he wrote the first draft of his debut novel.

Craft left the Tribune in 1987 to work for his partner's family-owned business, which manufactured musical wind instruments. During his time, he was able to focus on his writing.

In 1991, Craft's debut novel, Rehearsing, was accepted by Los Hombres Press, a small publisher of gay writing in San Diego. The book was released in February 1993.

In the early 2000s, Craft began playwriting and screenwriting. His stage play Photo Flash was performed in 2003 in Wisconsin, then in 2008 in California. In 2011, he was involved in the production of Pink Squirrels, a short, independent film.

Awards

Publications

Novels 

 The Macguffin (2011)
 Inside Dumont: A Novel in Stories (2016)
 Desert Getaway (2022)

Claire Gray series 

 Rehearsing (1993)
 Desert Autumn (2001)
 Desert Winter (2003)
 Desert Spring (2004)
 Desert Summer (2005)

Mark Manning Mysteries 

 Flight Dreams (1997)
 Eye Contact (1998)
 Body Language (1999)
 Name Games (2000)
 Boy Toy (2001)
 Hot Spot (2002)
 Bitch Slap (2004)

Mister Puss series 

 FlabberGassed (2018)
 ChoirMaster (2019)
 HomeComing (2020)

Anthology contributions 

 Chase The Moon: Issue One, edited by Matt Creswell (2014)
 Palm Springs Noir, edited by Barbara DeMarco-Barrett (2021)

Plays 

 Photo Flash (2003, 2008)

References

External links 

 Official website

Living people
1950 births
University of Illinois College of Liberal Arts and Sciences alumni
Writers from Illinois
Antioch University alumni